The Scotland women's national basketball team represents the Scotland in international women's basketball competitions.

Competitions

Olympic Games

World Championship

EuroBasket

External links
basketballscotland (Official website)

Women's national basketball teams
basketball
national